Koil  Assembly constituency is one  of the 403 constituencies of the Uttar Pradesh Legislative Assembly,  India. It is a part of the Aligarh district and one  of the five assembly constituencies in the Aligarh Lok Sabha constituency. First election in this assembly constituency was held in 1952 after the "DPACO (1951)" (delimitation order) was passed in 1951. After the "Delimitation of Parliamentary and Assembly Constituencies Order" was passed in 2008, the constituency was assigned identification number 75.

Wards  / Areas
Extent  of Koil Assembly constituency is KC Koil, PC Bhamola Mafi of Morthal KC &  Ward Nos. 7, 22, 28, 30 to 34, 36, 40 to 44, 47, 48, 49, 51, 52, 53 & 57  in Aligarh (M Corp.) of Koil Tehsil.

Members of the Legislative Assembly

Election results

2022

2012

See also

Aligarh district
Aligarh Lok Sabha constituency
Sixteenth Legislative Assembly of Uttar Pradesh
Uttar Pradesh Legislative Assembly

References

External links
 

Assembly constituencies of Uttar Pradesh
Politics of Aligarh district
Constituencies established in 1951